Graham Lee may refer to:

Graham Lee (jockey) (born 1975), Irish jockey
Graham Lee (musician) (born 1953), Australian rock guitarist

See also 
Graeme Lee (disambiguation)